The Western Hospital, originally the Fulham Hospital, was a hospital for smallpox established in Fulham, London, in 1877.

History

The hospital was established as the Fulham Hospital in Fulham, London, in 1877. It became the Western Fever Hospital in 1885 (soon after the 1884 establishment of nearby Fulham Parish Infirmary, later renamed Fulham Hospital), and additional fever blocks were built in the early 1890s.

It joined the National Health Service under the management of the South West Metropolitan Regional Health Board in 1948. It closed in 1979 and the hospital was subsequently demolished.

References

External links 
 Western Fever Hospital, Fulham

Smallpox
Defunct hospitals in London
Fulham
1877 establishments in England
Fever hospitals